Marlene Korthals (born 16 May 1943) is an Austrian luger. She competed in the women's singles event at the 1968 Winter Olympics.

References

1943 births
Living people
Austrian female lugers
Olympic lugers of Austria
Lugers at the 1968 Winter Olympics
People from Liezen District
Sportspeople from Styria